A list of villages in Nassau and Suffolk Counties, Long Island, New York.

A
Amityville (Suffolk County)
Asharoken (Suffolk County)
Atlantic Beach (Nassau County)

B
Babylon (Suffolk County)
Baxter Estates (Nassau County)
Bayville (Nassau County)
Bellerose (Nassau County)
Belle Terre (Suffolk County)
 Bellmore, New York (Nassau County)
Bellport (Suffolk County)
Bethpage (Nassau County)
Brightwaters (Suffolk County)
Brookville  (Nassau County)
Brentwood (Suffolk County)

C
Cedarhurst (Nassau County)
Centre Island (Nassau County)Copaigue
Cove Neck (Nassau County)
Centereach (Suffolk County)

D
Dering Harbor (Suffolk County)
Deer Park

E
East Hampton (Suffolk County)
East Hills (Nassau County)
East Rockaway (Nassau County)
East Williston (Nassau County)

F
Farmingdale (Nassau County)
Floral Park (Nassau County)
Flower Hill (Nassau County)
Freeport (Nassau County)
Franklin Square (Nassau County)

G
Garden City (Nassau County)
Great Neck (Nassau County)
Great Neck Estates (Nassau County)
Great Neck Plaza (Nassau County)
Greenlawn (suffolk County)
Greenport (Suffolk County)
Greenvale (Nassau County)

H
Head of the Harbor (Suffolk County)
Hempstead (Nassau County)
Hewlett Bay Park (Nassau County)
Hewlett Harbor (Nassau County)
Hewlett Neck (Nassau County)
Hicksville (Nassau County)
Huntington Bay (Suffolk County)
Hampton Bays (Suffolk County)
Hauppague Bay (Suffolk County)

I
Islandia (Suffolk County)
Island Park (Nassau County)

K
Kensington (Nassau County)
Kings Park, New York (Suffolk County)
Kings Point (Nassau County)
Kismet, Fire Island, New York (Suffolk County)

L
Lake Grove (Suffolk County)
Lake Success (Nassau County)
Lattingtown (Nassau County)
Laurel Hollow (Nassau County)
Lawrence (Nassau County)
Lindenhurst (Suffolk County)
Lloyd Harbor (Suffolk County)
Lynbrook (Nassau County)
Long Beach, New York

M
Malverne (Nassau County)
Manorhaven (Nassau County)
Massapequa (Nassau County)
Mastic Beach (Suffolk County)
Matinecock (Nassau County)
Mill Neck (Nassau County)
Mineola (Nassau County)
Munsey Park (Nassau County)
Muttontown (Nassau County)
Miller Place (Suffolk County)
Mt. Sinai (Suffolk County)

N
New Hyde Park (Nassau County)
Nissequogue (Suffolk County)
North Haven (Suffolk County)
North Hills (Nassau County)
Northport (Suffolk County)

O
Ocean Beach (Suffolk County)
Old Brookville (Nassau County)
Old Field (Suffolk County)
Old Westbury (Nassau County)
Oyster Bay Cove (Nassau County)

P
Patchogue (Suffolk County)
Plandome (Nassau County)
Plandome Heights (Nassau County)
Plandome Manor (Nassau County)
Plainview (Nassau County)
Poquott (Suffolk County)
Port Jefferson (Suffolk County)
Port Washington North (Nassau County)

Q
Quogue (Suffolk County)

R
Rockville Centre (Nassau County)
Roslyn (Nassau County)
Roslyn Estates (Nassau County)
Roslyn Harbor (Nassau County)
Russell Gardens (Nassau County)
Riverhead (Suffolk County)
Roosevelt,(Nassau County)

S
Saddle Rock (Nassau County)
Sag Harbor (Suffolk County)
Sagaponack (Suffolk County)
Saltaire (Suffolk County)
Sands Point (Nassau County)
Sea Cliff (Nassau County)
Shoreham (Suffolk County)
South Floral Park (Nassau County)
Southampton (Suffolk County)
Stewart Manor (Nassau County)
Syosset (Nassau County)
Sound Beach (Suffolk County)

T
Thomaston (Nassau County)

U
Upper Brookville (Nassau County)
Uniondale

V
Valley Stream (Nassau County)
Village of the Branch (Suffolk County)

W
West Hampton Dunes (Suffolk County)
Westbury (Nassau County)
Westhampton Beach (Suffolk County)
Williston Park (Nassau County)
Woodsburgh (Nassau County)
Wyandanch (Suffolk County)

Villages On Long Island
Long Island
Villages